Giselle Anne Töngi-Walters (born June 14, 1978) is a Swiss-Filipino actress, dancer, singer, host, VJ and model.

Early life and education
Töngi was born on June 14, 1978 in Neuilly-sur-Seine, France to a Swiss father, Erich, and Filipina mother, Aurora. She has four siblings namely: Avie, Tony, John and Sharon. She was raised by her mother in New York and moved to Manila at age 15.

Töngi studied at the Lee Strasberg School of Acting in New York City. She obtained a bachelor's degree in communication studies from the University of California, Los Angeles and a master's degree in nonprofit management from Antioch University.

Career
Töngi was 5 when she was discovered by an agent at a mall.  She was then launched as a member of the pioneer batch of Star Circle (now Star Magic). In the early 2000s, she left a thriving acting career in the Philippines to try her luck in Hollywood. She landed a role in Saved by the Bell: The Musical and in 2004 in the stage play Days When Cocaine Was King. She played a planted fan to the contestants during a challenge in America's Next Top Model, Cycle 16, which can be seen in Episode 9 of the said Cycle.

In 2014, Töngi replaced Jannelle So as host and producer of Kababayan Today, which airs on KSCI (LA-18).

Personal life
Töngi married bartender Tim Walters in a beach wedding in Boracay on February 19, 2005. Together they have a son Kenobi Benjamin and a daughter Sakura Anne Marie.

Filmography

Television

Film

Theater

Discography

Compilation appearances

Studio albums

Track listing

References

External links
 
 

American actresses of Filipino descent
Star Magic
Viva Artists Agency
That's Entertainment Wednesday Group Members
VJs (media personalities)
Living people
1978 births
American people of Swiss descent
American expatriates in the Philippines
University of California, Los Angeles alumni
Actresses from Metro Manila
Actresses from New York City
Antioch University alumni
21st-century American women
ABS-CBN personalities
GMA Network personalities